12 Trianguli is a solitary star located in the northern constellation Triangulum, with an apparent magnitude of 5.37, making it faintly visible to the naked eye under ideal conditions. It is calculated to be about  old with a stellar classification of F0 III, making it an F-type giant.

Together with ι Trianguli and 10 Trianguli, it forms part of the obsolete Triangulum Minus.

References

F-type giants
Triangulum (constellation)
Trianguli, 12
15257
11486
0717
Durchmusterung objects